Inger Lundberg (194818 February 2006) was a Swedish politician and member of the Riksdag, the national legislature. A member of the Social Democratic Party, she represented Örebro County between May 1991 and February 2006.

Lundberg was born in Nacka. She has a degree in sociology from Örebro University (1972). She died on 18 February 2006 aged 57 at Örebro University Hospital.

References

1948 births
2006 deaths
20th-century Swedish women politicians
20th-century Swedish politicians
21st-century Swedish women politicians
Members of the Riksdag 1988–1991
Members of the Riksdag 1991–1994
Members of the Riksdag 1994–1998
Members of the Riksdag 1998–2002
Members of the Riksdag 2002–2006
Members of the Riksdag from the Social Democrats
Örebro University alumni
Women members of the Riksdag